SA10 can refer to the following:

 SA-10 Grumble, the NATO reporting name of the S-300, a Soviet surface-to-air missile system.
 One of Systems Concepts' major products, the SA-10, was an interface which allowed PDP-10s to be connected to disk and tape drives designed for use with the channel interfaces of IBM mainframes.
 Casio SA-10 a Casiotone.
 Sergio Agüero, referred to his initials and his kit number.
 SA-10, the tenth and final Saturn I launch vehicle. It was launched in AS-105, a NASA mission apart of the Apollo program on July 30th, 1965.